The Secretary of State for War and the Colonies was a British cabinet-level position responsible for the army and the British colonies (other than India). 
The Secretary was supported by an Under-Secretary of State for War and the Colonies.

History
The Department was created in 1801. In 1854 it was split into the separate offices of Secretary of State for War and Secretary of State for the Colonies.

List of Secretaries of State for War and the Colonies (1801–1854)

Notes

UK History of the Foreign and Commonwealth Office 

War and the Colonies
1801 establishments in the United Kingdom
1854 disestablishments in the United Kingdom
Defunct ministerial offices in the United Kingdom